Obabika Lake is a lake in Northeastern Ontario, Canada, located west of Lake Temagami in the Temagami region. It straddles the Sudbury-Nipissing District boundary.  The Obabika River flows out of the south-western portion of the lake and eventually drains into the Sturgeon River.

References

See also
Lakes of Temagami

Lakes of Sudbury District
Lakes of Temagami